Silvan Dam is an embankment concrete-face rock-fill currently under construction on the Batman River in the district of Silvan, Diyarbakır Province in southeastern Turkey. It is part of the Southeastern Anatolia Project and located upstream of the Batman Dam. Construction began on 26 July 2011 and is expected to be complete in 2022. The purpose of the dam is hydroelectric power production and irrigation. The power station will have an installed capacity of 160 MW.

In 2014, the dam, as well as other in southeast Turkey such as the Ilisu Dam, became a prime target of Kurdistan Workers' Party (PKK) militants after peace talks collapsed with the government. Attacks on the dam, supporting structures and workers are part of the PKK's efforts to stop construction. These attacks delayed construction by 2 years.

The construction of the Silvan Tunnel which brings the water from the dam to the surrounding plains started in June 2019. The dam body was completed in January 2021 and the entire project is expected to be completed in 2022.

References

External links

Dams in Diyarbakır Province
Southeastern Anatolia Project
Rock-filled dams
Hydroelectric power stations in Turkey
Dams on the Batman River

Dams under construction in Turkey